The County of Mornington is one of the 37 counties of Victoria which are part of the cadastral divisions of Australia, used for land titles. It is located to the south-east of Melbourne, including the Mornington Peninsula, French Island and Phillip Island. The county was proclaimed in 1849.

Parishes 
Parishes include:
 Balnarring, Victoria
 Berwick, Victoria
 Bittern, Victoria
 Bunyip, Victoria
 Corinella, Victoria
 Cranbourne, Victoria
 Eumemmerring, Victoria
 Fingal, Victoria
 Flinders, Victoria
 Frankston, Victoria
 French Island, Victoria
 Gembrook, Victoria
Jeetho West, Victoria
Jeetho, Victoria
Jumbunna East, Victoria
 Jumbunna, Victoria
Kangerong, Victoria
 Kongwak, Victoria
Koo Wee Rup East, Victoria
 Koo Wee Rup, Victoria
Kurrambee, Victoria
 Lang Lang East, Victoria
 Lang Lang, Victoria
 Langwarrin, Victoria
 Lyndhurst, Victoria
 Moorooduc, Victoria
 Nar Nar Goon, Victoria
 Narre Warren, Victoria
Nepean, Victoria
 Pakenham, Victoria
 Phillip Island, Victoria
Sherwood, Victoria
Tonimbuk East, Victoria
 Tonimbuk, Victoria
 Tyabb, Victoria
Wannaeue, Victoria
Wonthaggi North, Victoria
 Wonthaggi, Victoria
Woolamai, Victoria
Yallock, Victoria
 Yannathan, Victoria

References

Vicnames, place name details
Research aids, Victoria 1910
Cadastral map of the Co. of Mornington, showing timber and water reserves, pastoral, agricultural and grazing lands and mineral deposits. 1880s, National Library of Australia

Counties of Victoria (Australia)
Mornington Peninsula